Qaleh Qafeh Rural District is a rural district (dehestan) in the Central District of Minudasht County, Golestan Province, Iran. At the 2006 census, its population was 5,172, in 1,338 families.  The rural district has 15 villages.

References 

Rural Districts of Golestan Province
Minudasht County